Wisconsin v. City of New York, 517 U.S. 1 (1996), was a United States Supreme Court case that held that under the Constitution's Census Clause, Congress is granted with the authority to conduct an "actual enumeration" of the American society, chiefly for the purpose of allocating congressional representation among the states.

Congress assigned the responsibility of conducting an "actual enumeration" of the American society to the Secretary of Commerce, who in the 1990 census, decided not to implement the statistical correction, better known as the post-enumeration survey (PES) to adjust an undercount in the initial population count.

Furthermore, following several citizens' groups, states, and cities, Wisconsin disputed the Secretary's decision not to use PES declaring that it resulted in an undercounting of certain identifiable minority groups.

See also
 Wesberry v. Sanders (1964)
 Department of Commerce v. Montana (1992)
 Franklin v. Massachusetts (1992)
 Gaffney v. Cummings (1973)

References

External links
 

United States Supreme Court cases
United States Supreme Court cases of the Rehnquist Court
1996 in United States case law